The 2022 Mubadala World Tennis Championship was a non-ATP/WTA-affiliated exhibition tennis tournament. It was the 14th edition of the Mubadala World Tennis Championship with some of the world's top-ranked players competing in the event, held in a knockout format. The winner received $250,000 in prize money. The event was held at the International Tennis Centre at the Zayed Sports City in Abu Dhabi, United Arab Emirates. It served as a warm-up event for the season, with the ATP Tour beginning on December 29, 2022.

Carlos Alcaraz (world number 1) and Casper Ruud (number 3) received byes to the semi-final. Stefanos Tsitsipas defeated Andrey Rublev, 6–2, 4–6, 6–2, to win the men's tournament. Ons Jabeur defeated Emma Raducanu, 5–7, 6–3, [10–8], to win the women's tournament.

Champions

Men's singles
  
  Stefanos Tsitsipas def.  Andrey Rublev, 6–2, 4–6, 6–2

Women's singles
  Ons Jabeur def.  Emma Raducanu, 5–7, 6–3, [10–8]

Day-by-day summaries

Players

Men's singles 
 Frances Tiafoe (withdrew)

Women's singles

References

External links
Official website

2022 in Emirati tennis
World Tennis Championship
Mubadala World Tennis Championship - Men
2022 tennis exhibitions